Dendrophilia leguminella is a moth of the family Gelechiidae. It was described by Ponomarenko in 1993. It is found in Russia (Primorskii krai).

The larvae feed on Lespedeza bicolor.

References

leguminella
Moths described in 1993
Moths of Japan